(Isaura: Slave Girl) is a 1976 Brazilian telenovela produced by TV Globo, originally broadcast between October 11, 1976 and February 5, 1977. Based on the 1865 novel of the same name by 19th century abolitionist writer Bernardo Guimarães, it tells the story of the struggles of Isaura, a mixed-race slave, to find happiness during the Brazilian Empire. It starred Lucélia Santos in the titular role and Rubens de Falco as slave owner Leôncio Almeida, the main antagonist. It was adapted by Gilberto Braga and directed by Herval Rossano and Milton Gonçalves, running 100 episodes.

Plot

The story is set in Brazil in the 1860s, 20 years before the emancipation of slaves. Isaura, a mixed-race slave, lives in the house of Comendador Almeida and his wife Dona Ester in Rio de Janeiro. Dona Ester raised her as her own daughter. She is educated and beautiful but very modest. Almost everyone likes her, especially Januaria, the cook, who is a mother figure to her. However, her master, the Comendador, is not particularly fond of Isaura and forbids Dona Ester from letting her dine with them like a family member. Another person who hates her is the black slave Rosa, who detests the privileged life Isaura leads.

At the beginning of the story Leôncio, the Comendador's son arrives home from Paris where he attended university but did not acquire a degree as he was more interested in debauchery. He takes a liking to Isaura and tries to seduce her but she resists. Dona Ester, Leôncio and Isaura soon move to the Almeidas' countryside residence in Campos, where we meet new characters: Francisco the cruel overseer who led the plantation in its owner's absence, André, the newly bought slave who incites Francisco's hatred by his dignity and bravery, and neighbour plantation owners Dona Alba and her children Tobias and Thais. Tobias and Leôncio start to hate each other when Tobias witnesses Leôncio's cruel treatment of a sick slave. Later Tobias meets Isaura who is taking a walk, and they fall in love, but Tobias doesn't know she is a slave. Also, Miguel, the overseer at Tobias's plantation confesses to Isaura that he is her father.

Almeida arrives and introduces Leôncio to Malvina, the daughter of a friend of his. Malvina doesn't know how evil Leôncio is, and she marries him. She is very kind to Isaura. Her maidservant Santa is happy because now she can be close to her beloved André. Dona Ester dies, her last wish is that the Comendador manumits Isaura, which he promises but then he doesn't keep his promise and doesn't give the signed document to Isaura. Tobias learns that Isaura is a slave, and offers to buy and marry her. Leôncio doesn't agree but Dona Carmen, the Comendador's new wife steals the emancipation document and gives it to him. Isaura is now free and preparing for her wedding, but Leôncio kidnaps Tobias and keeps him in an abandoned mill, planning to kill him, and he burns the document that granted Isaura's freedom. Later Malvina discovers Tobias in the mill and frees him, but before they could exit the mill, Leôncio and Francisco – who believe it's Isaura in the mill with Tobias – close the doors and set the mill on fire. Santa witnesses this, but is threatened by Francisco. Leôncio, pretending to be in mourning, goes on a travel, but not before condemning Isaura to regular slave work, in spite of the fact that his friends, including Malvina's brother Enrique, all believe he set her free.

When Leôncio comes back, he's still obsessed with Isaura and offers her a choice: either to become his mistress, or to go to a plantation, where she'll cut sugar cane 14 hours a day. Isaura repeatedly refuses, and Leôncio orders her to be tied out and orders her to be whipped in the morning. When André learns about this he attacks Leôncio, so they tie him out too. Santa alerts Miguel who helps Isaura and André escape.

Isaura, Miguel, André and Santa are on the run, and Leôncio sends slave hunters after them. They settle down on Dona Carmen's estate in a small town in Minas Gerais, Barbacena. Isaura, who now pretends to be a white lady named Dona Elvira, meets and falls in love with Don Álvaro, who is one of the richest men in Brazil. He is also very modern, and already set all his slaves free. But she knows she can't stay with him as they aren't safe in Brazil, Miguel already bought the ship tickets to the United States where slavery has been abolished three years previously. Before they would leave, Isaura agrees to attend a ball with Álvaro. Here a man called Martinho, who read Leôncio's newspaper ads about his runaway slaves, recognizes her and makes a scandal. Despite help from Álvaro and his lawyer friend, Leôncio manages to take Isaura, André and Santa home, and sends Miguel to prison. He promises Isaura that he will let Miguel be released from prison and sets her free if she marries a man of his choosing – Beltrao, the hunchbacked gardener, whom she doesn't love. Isaura accepts, to set her father free, and also because Rosa wrote a fake letter that makes her believe Álvaro forgot her and married. At the wedding before she marries Beltrao, Álvaro arrives, and reveals that in the past months he managed to pay all those to whom Leôncio owed money, and since the money he owed was way more than his whole property, Leôncio is destitute, and the house, the plantation and everything belongs to Álvaro now. While Leôncio is trying to run away, he meets the overseer Francisco, who has decided to reveal how Leôncio murdered Malvina and Tobias. After a fight with Álvaro, desperate Leôncio shoots himself, and Álvaro, the new master frees all the slaves and asks for Isaura's hand. Rosa tries to poison Isaura but accidentally drinks the poisoned drink herself.

Cast

 Lucélia Santos as Isaura/Elvira the slave, main character.
 Rubens de Falco as Leôncio Corea de Almeida, Isaura's master.
 Edwin Luisi as Álvaro, Isaura's second beloved, finally her husband.
 Léa Garcia as Rosa, a slave at the Almeidas who hates Isaura.
 Gilberto Martinho as Comendador Almeida, Leôncio's father. He leaves his countryside mansion and plantation to Leôncio after his marriage, and retires in Rio. At first hostile to Isaura but later becomes sympathetic to her as he witnesses his son's cruel treatment of her.
 Roberto Pirillo as Tobias, Isaura's first love, from the nearby Ibituba Plantation. Killed by Leôncio.
 Norma Blum as Malvina, Leôncio's wife, who is very kind to Isaura. She is accidentally killed by Leôncio.
 Mário Cardoso as Henrique, Malvina's brother, who tries to help Isaura several times.
 Haroldo de Oliveira as André, a slave who is cruelly treated, and later runs away with Miguel and Isaura.
 Maria das Graças as Santa, Malvina's maidservant, later André's wife, runs away with him and Miguel and Isaura.
 Isaac Bardavid as Francisco, the overseer of Leôncio's plantation. Cruel to slaves.
 Zeni Pereira as Januária, the cook. A friend of Isaura and Miguel, she convinced Miguel to reveal to Isaura that he is her father.
 Beatriz Lyra as Ester, Leôncio's mother. Isaura's godmother who raised her.
 Átila Iório as Miguel, the overseer at Ibituba Plantation, and Isaura's father.
 Elisa Fernandes as Taís, sister of Tobias. Later marries Henrique.
 Dary Reis as Conselheiro Fontoura, father of Malvina and Henrique. An old friend of the Comendador's.
 Ângela Leal as Carmen, the Comendador's second wife. Used to be an actress, and is despised by Leôncio.
 Ítalo Rossi as José Matoso, Leôncio's friend who is eager to marry off his sister Aninha, because until then he won't receive his inheritance which he needs because he's in debt.
 Francisco Dantas as Mr. Matoso, Aninha's uncle.
 Myrian Rios as Aninha Matoso, Leôncio's second wife.
 Carlos Duval as Beltrão, gardener, almost Isaura's husband.
 André Valli as Martinho, who betrayed Isaura.
 Clarisse Abujamra as Lúcia, a girl in Barbacena. Her parents wanted her to marry Álvaro and were angry at Isaura, but Lúcia married a doctor and was happy with him.
 Henriette Morineau as Madeleine Besançon, a famous French actress who stages Racine's Phoedra in Rio. Gets to know Isaura and asks her if she wants to escape from Brazil with her help.

Soundtrack
An EP containing the original soundtrack of the telenovela was released in 1976 by Som Livre. It contained the following tracks:
 "Prisioneira" – Elizeth Cardoso (Isaura's theme)
 "Amor Sem Medo" – Francis Hime (Álvaro's theme)
 "Retirantes" – Dorival Caymmi (opening theme)
 "Nanã" – Orquestra Som Livre
 "Banzo" – Os Tincoãs
 "Mãe Preta" – Coral Som Livre

Escrava Isaura around the world
 achieved worldwide success, being broadcast in over 80 countries. According to a research conducted by Good Morning America, it is the most dubbed program in the history of world television. It was a major hit in South America, the Eastern Bloc, Portugal, Italy, Greece, Turkey, countries in Africa, Indonesia, and the People's Republic of China.

Escrava Isaura is one of the only foreign-language telenovelas aired in the United Kingdom, being broadcast on Channel 4 in 1987 as Isaura the Slave Girl. It was also the first show broadcast dubbed into Galician when Galician-language channel TVG was launched in 1985.

It was the first telenovela broadcast in Hungary under the title  ("Fate of the slaves"). According to an urban legend, Hungarian viewers collected money before the happy ending of the telenovela to free Isaura. Later Lucélia Santos visited the country. After the success of the series in Hungary, other communist countries also aired the show. In 1984, it became the most popular program in the history of Polish television, achieving an 81 share. Since then, it was aired at least two other times in the country.

Lucélia Santos became the first non-Chinese leading actress of a television show broadcast in the People's Republic of China. It was the first soap opera aired in the Soviet Union in 1988–1989 (reduced to 15 hour-long episodes) and in Poland in 1985. The word  (farm/hacienda) jokingly became a synonym for the small land plots used for dachas. In the show,  is used as a synonym for plantation.

It was broadcast in communist Albania in the 1980s, many parts of the series put together. Izaura is a famous name among babies born at that time, and so are few more names from the cast. Small FIAT police vans were for a while called "Isaura", a reference to the slave-like treatment that awaited most of those that were unlucky enough to ever be dragged into one. A running joke was that Tefta Cami, the minister of public instruction, went to the national TV station to see the last part of the series, in order to see it before the others.

 was also first telenovela broadcast in the former Socialist Federal Republic of Yugoslavia. It was broadcast with unexpected success in Serbia, Slovenia and Croatia in 1988. Although the series has been extremely successful, the telenovela craze in former Yugoslavian countries did not continue until ten years later with Kassandra in 1997.
It was also broadcast in TVRI in Indonesia around 1986.

It has been extremely successful in the country at that time, especially among women.

Criticism
The novela was criticised by the Afro-Brazilian movement for the decision of director Herval Rossano to cast a white actress to play the leading role. Later in an interview, writer Gilberto Braga declared that he wished to cast Louise Cardoso to play Isaura, also a white actress. It was, however, one of the first telenovelas to feature a large black ensemble cast.

See also
 List of films featuring slavery

References

External links 
 

Brazilian telenovelas
TV Globo telenovelas
1976 telenovelas
1976 Brazilian television series debuts
1977 Brazilian television series endings
Telenovelas by Gilberto Braga
Portuguese-language telenovelas
Television shows based on Brazilian novels
Television shows set in Rio de Janeiro (city)
Television series set in the 1860s